United Nations Security Council Resolution 307, adopted on December 21, 1971, after hearing statements from India and Pakistan, the Council demanded that a durable cease-fire be observed until withdrawals could take place to respect the cease-fire line in Jammu and Kashmir.  The council also called for international assistance in the relief of suffering and rehabilitation of refugees as well as their return home and a request for the Secretary-General to keep the council informed on developments.

The resolution was adopted by 13 votes to none; the People's Republic of Poland and Soviet Union abstained from the vote.

See also
 Kashmir conflict
 List of United Nations Security Council Resolutions 301 to 400 (1971–1976)
 United Nations Security Council Resolution 303

References 
Text of the Resolution at undocs.org

External links
 

 0307
1971 in India
 0307
December 1971 events
1970s in Jammu and Kashmir
1971 in Pakistan